Quinctius Flamininus is the name of:
Titus Quinctius Flamininus (228–174 BC), Roman politician and general instrumental in the Roman conquest of Greece
Lucius Quinctius Flamininus, younger brother of Titus, Roman consul in 192 BC